Monty Python's The Meaning of Life is an adventure game created by 7th Level in 1997 for Windows.  The game is based on the 1983 film of the same name and was the third of three Monty Python games created by 7th Level.  It was rated Mature by the ESRB in North America.

Plot and gameplay 
Loosely based on the 1983 film of the same name, the title sees the player traverse through the different stages of life while collecting items.

The Mrs. Particle and Mrs. Velocity sketch was released as an unlockable easter egg in the game.

Development 
It was the third in a trilogy of Python games developed by 7th Level, after Monty Python's Complete Waste of Time and Monty Python and the Quest for the Holy Grail.

Halfway through making the Meaning of Life game, 7th Level went bankrupt, leading to Take Two Software to take over the financing, development and publication of the title; due to the hurried completion the game was released with various bugs 

While preparing for the fall launch of the title, Eric Idle also worked on the expansion of PythOnline.

Critical reception 

The Los Angeles Times said the game is "heavy on disjointed, psychedelic cartoons".

Destructoid felt the game had "completely nonsensical, illogical, weird-as-hell puzzles". Adventureclassicgaming asserted that it plays more like an adventure game than previous Python titles. Just adventure felt the interface was easy to use.

PC Gamer gave high praise to its sense of humour. Entertainment Weekly wrote that it "subverts multimedia conventions and good taste with equally silly vigor". The AV Vault noted the game's use of dry off-the-wall humour. Monty Python fansite Montypython.net wrote it is "difficult, maddeningly illogical, silly and sure to offend".

References

External links 
 Monty Python homepage at 7th Level (Archived)

1997 video games
Adventure games
Windows games
Windows-only games
Monty Python video games
Parody video games
Video games based on films
Video games developed in the United States
Single-player video games
7th Level games